JS Hatakaze (DDG-171/TV-3520) is a  guided missile destroyer built for the Japan Maritime Self-Defense Force (JMSDF). Hatakaze was the first vessel completed of her class. She was the first JMSDF vessel to use gas turbine propulsion.

Construction and career 
Hatakaze was laid down on the 20 May 1983 at Mitsubishi Heavy Industries shipyard in Nagasaki. She was launched on 9 November 1984, and commissioned on 27 March 1986.

She was converted to a training vessel on 19 March 2020 and was redesignated as TV-3520. On 18 August, a JMSDF MCH-101 helicopter successfully landed and took off from Hatakaze.

From 9 February to 16 March 2021, she participated in the open sea practice voyage of the 54th General Executive Candidate Course (internal course) students with the escort ship JS Yūgiri and the training ship .

See also
List of active Japan Maritime Self-Defense Force ships

References

External links

 Military Factory

1984 ships
Hatakaze-class destroyers
Ships built by Mitsubishi Heavy Industries
Training ships of the Japan Maritime Self-Defense Force